The sixth season of the television sitcom Brooklyn Nine-Nine premiered on January 10, 2019 on NBC and concluded on May 16, 2019. This is the first season to air on NBC (whose partner studio Universal Television produces the show), as the series was cancelled on May 10, 2018 by Fox. NBC picked it up for a sixth season shortly after the series had been cancelled on May 11, 2018. The season consists of 18 episodes.

Summary
Holt finds out he lost the commissioner position to John Kelly and is sent into a deep depression until Jake and Amy encourage him to stand up to Kelly's regressive policies, resulting in the new commissioner retaliating against the Nine-Nine. Gina quits her job after deciding that her talents would be better spent elsewhere and becomes a successful internet celebrity. Amy and Jake debate on whether they want kids or not. Terry passes the Lieutenant's Exam, and wins the "Cinco de Mayo" Heist aka Halloween Heist for the first time. However the Nine-Nine doesn't have enough funds for him to stay and he finds out that he might be transferred to Staten Island.

Jake and Holt discover that Kelly is using his new anonymous tip app to illegally wiretap the population, forcing them to recruit some of their old rivals to help expose his crimes. Thanks to Jake and Wuntch staging an arrest for a fake kidnapping, Kelly is suspended and Wuntch becomes the acting commissioner. She uses her new position to allow Terry to stay at the Nine-Nine and force Holt to make up for his missing patrol officer days.

Cast

Main
 Andy Samberg as Jake Peralta
 Stephanie Beatriz as Rosa Diaz
 Terry Crews as Terry Jeffords
 Melissa Fumero as Amy Santiago
 Joe Lo Truglio as Charles Boyle
 Chelsea Peretti as Gina Linetti
 Andre Braugher as Raymond Holt
 Dirk Blocker as Michael Hitchcock
 Joel McKinnon Miller as Norm Scully/Earl Scully

Notes

Recurring
 Phil Reeves as John Kelly
 Marc Evan Jackson as Kevin Cozner
 Kevin Dorff as Hank
 Olga Merediz as Julia Diaz
 Bertila Damas as Camila Santiago
 Reggie Lee as Ronald Yee
 Antonio Raul Corbo as Nikolaj Boyle
 Drew Tarver as Gary Jennings
 Winston Story as Bill Hummertrout
 Tim Meadows as Caleb John Gosche
 Ken Marino as Jason "C.J." Stentley
 Dean Winters as Keith "The Vulture" Pembroke
 Kyra Sedgwick as Madeline Wuntch
 Cameron Esposito as Jocelyn Pryce

Guest
 Alan Ritchson as young Scully
 Wyatt Nash as young Hitchcock
 Donna D'Errico as Marissa Costa
 Daniel Di Tomasso as young Gio Costa
 Paul Rust as Mikey Joseph
 Yassir Lester as Quentin Chase
 Mario Lopez as himself
 Eugene Lee Yang as Theo Lorql
 Craig Robinson as Doug Judy
 Nicole Byer as Trudy Judy
 Rob Riggle as Rob Dulubnik
 Michael Mosley as Franco McCoy
 Karan Soni as Gordon Lundt
 Briga Heelan as Keri Brennan
 Jonathan Chase as Seth Haggerty
 Gabe Liedman as Oliver Cox
 Matt Lowe as Beefer
 Lin-Manuel Miranda as David Santiago
 Ike Barinholtz as Gintars Irbe
 David Paymer as William Tate
 Julia Sweeney as Pam
 Oliver Muirhead as Wesley Allister
 Bob Stephenson as Randy
 Sean Astin as Sergeant Knox

Episodes

Production

Cancellation and renewal
On May 10, 2018, it was announced that Fox had cancelled Brooklyn Nine-Nine. Following the announcement, other networks including Netflix, Hulu, and TBS expressed interest in picking up the series for a sixth season. However, it was later announced that all three networks declined to pick up the series. A hashtag supporting the renewal of the series also became the number one trend on Twitter.

On May 11, 2018, the day after the announcement of its cancellation, NBC officially picked up the series for a 13-episode sixth season. An NBC executive stated about the series, "Ever since we sold this show to Fox I've regretted letting it get away, and it's high time it came back to its rightful home." On September 7, 2018, NBC ordered five additional episodes for the season, increasing the episode total to 18.

Casting
All current main cast members returned for the sixth season. On October 3, 2018 Chelsea Peretti announced that she would depart the series during the sixth season. Her final scene was filmed in the first full week of November 2018. Peretti's final episode as a main cast member was the fourth episode, entitled "Four Movements"; she returned to the series as a guest star in the fifteenth episode, "Return of the King."

Directing
Season 6 marks the first season that features episodes directed by a main cast member. Stephanie Beatriz directed the episode "He Said, She Said", which was inspired by the Me Too movement and focuses on the investigation of a sexual assault. Joe Lo Truglio directed the thirteenth episode, titled "The Bimbo" and Melissa Fumero directed "Return of the King", which focuses on the return of Chelsea Peretti's character, Gina Linetti.

Broadcast
The season premiered as a mid-season replacement in the middle of the 2018–19 television season. It aired on Thursdays at 9:00 pm from January 10, 2019.

Reception

Ratings

Critical response
The sixth season received generally positive reviews, who praised the many guest stars and the John Kelly storyline, although the increase in the pace of dialogues received a mixed response. The review aggregator website Rotten Tomatoes reports a 100% approval rating, with an average score of 8.32/10, based on 27 reviews. The website's consensus reads, "Following a period of uncertainty and a shift to NBC, Brooklyn Nine-Nine reemerges with its cast and tone wholly intact."

References

External links

  at NBC
 

 
2019 American television seasons
Brooklyn Nine-Nine